Campbell Beaton is a British producer.

About 
Campbell Beaton is a producer and director. He has made commercials for the likes of Mercedes, Burberry and Dolce & Gabbana for Mario Testino, and promos for artists ranging from Bjork, Professor Green and Unkle. 

Campbell has produced the shorts, Half Hearted by Max McGill, The Karman Line by Oscar Sharp and Sean De Sparengo’s Counting Backwards. He has also produced the 2017 Cannes Lions Grand Prix award winning VR project Not Get for Bjork by directors Warren and Nick

Campbell finished the feature film Hot Property with Myanna Buring which premiered by closing the London Comedy festival in 2017.

VR Awards 

Cannes Grand Prix winner 2017 for Bjork Not Get VR directed by Warren Du Preez and Nick Thornton Jones

Film awards 
 Cowboy Ben starring Shaun Dooley
 The Karman Line (Nomination for BAFTA 2015 Best Short Film).

References

Living people
British film directors
British film producers
Year of birth missing (living people)